Raivataka mountain was a mountain mentioned in the epic Mahābhārata and in the Harivaṃśa-purāṇa 2.55.111. In the Mahabharata it was mentioned as situated in the Anarta Kingdom. In the Harivaṃśa-purāṇa it is "close to the sporting ground of the King Raivataka" (2.56.29) and called "the living place for the gods" (2.55.111). People from Dvārakā visited this mountain and celebrated its worshipping as a grand festival. The same mountain also features prominently in Māgha's Śiśupāla-vadha. This mountain is identified to be the Girnar mountains in Gujarat.

References

Ancient Indian mountains